Name A Game was a DVD (formerly VHS) service provided by the Visual Entertainment Group that allowed fans of Australian rules football to purchase games that they have been interested in from the past, or to collect their club's games from the given season.

Name A Game was originally established as a VHS service in the early 1990s to collect games telecast by Channel Seven in full for future viewing. Initially only about half of all AFL games played were recorded, with games by struggling sides such as Fitzroy, Brisbane and Sydney generally not recorded. From 1996, Name A Game was able to record all AFL games into its “master library”, in which are stored the original VHS versions of each game.

The ABC preserved a total of thirty-eight (a quarter of the total) home-and-away games from its year broadcasting the VFL in 1987 for the Name A Game master library, but Channel Seven did not preserve any of its film of home-and-away games before the sixteenth round of 1990 with the exception of one match between Hawthorn and Geelong in the sixth round of 1989. However, all finals from 1987 to 1990 are available, as are a total of twelve finals from before 1987 that were not destroyed by Channel Seven in the early 1990s. Most of these are from the early 1970s.

Storage

Name A Game's master library is located in South Melbourne, and games which have never been requested on DVD were kept in their original VHS format until a customer ordered them. Games that have already been requested on DVD were copied several times so that there is no need for mastering in case of a future order, and the resultant copies were stored on-site in Richmond. When only one DVD copy remained and a customer made an order of that particular game, Name A Game made further copies so that it did not have to master again from VHS.

References

External links
 Official website

Australian Football League
Video production companies